DYYM (98.5 FM), broadcasting as 98.5 Radyo Natin, is a radio station owned by Manila Broadcasting Company and operated by the Municipal Government of Kalibo. Its studios are located along United Veterans Ave., Brgy. Poblacion, Kalibo.

References

Radio stations in Aklan
Radio stations established in 2002